Pechora (Pećöra) is a town in the Komi Republic, Russia, located on the Pechora River, west of and near the northern Ural Mountains. Population:

History
Pechora was granted town status in 1949. Pechora was also the site of a Stalin-era gulag that operated from 1932 to 1953, although it was partially emptied in 1941 as many of the inmates were forced into service in the Red Army. There is a dedicated room at the Pechora museum where they display many of the records and artifacts that were recovered from the gulag. "Pechora" translates to "cave" in Ukrainian.

Administrative and municipal status
Within the framework of administrative divisions, the town of Pechora is, together with two urban-type settlement administrative territories (comprising the urban-type settlements of Kozhva and Puteyets and eleven rural localities) and four rural-type settlement administrative territories (comprising seventeen rural localities), incorporated as the town of republic significance of Pechora—an administrative unit with the status equal to that of the districts. As a municipal division, the town of republic significance of Pechora is incorporated as Pechora Municipal District; the town of Pechora is incorporated within it as Pechora Urban Settlement. The two urban-type settlement administrative territories are incorporated into two urban settlements, and the four rural-type settlement administrative territories are incorporated into four rural settlements within the municipal district.

Transportation
The town is served by the Pechora Airport and the Pechora Railway.

Military
Pechora Kamenka military air base and Pechora Radar Station are located nearby.

Climate
Pechora has a subarctic climate (Köppen climate classification Dfc). Precipitation is moderate and is somewhat higher in summer than at other times of the year.

References

Notes

Sources

External links
Pechora. History. Nature 

Cities and towns in the Komi Republic